The  Little League World Series took place between August 23 and August 27 in Williamsport, Pennsylvania. The Li-Teh Little League of Kaohsiung, Taiwan, defeated the Western Little League of El Cajon, California, in the championship game of the 31st Little League World Series.

Teams

Championship bracket

Consolation bracket

Notable players
 Charlie Hayes of the Hattiesburg, Mississippi, team went on to play in MLB as a third baseman from 1988 to 2001.

External links
1977 Little League World Series
Line scores for the 1977 LLWS

Little League World Series
Little League World Series
[[Category:1977 in sports in Pennsylvania|Little League World Se